Vitis wilsoniae is a vining plant in the grape family native to China. It is commonly known as the net veined grape or reticulated grape. This species can be found in the provinces of Anhui, Chongqing, Fujian, Gansu, Guizhou, Henan, Hubei, Hunan, Shaanxi, Sichuan, Yunnan, and Zhejiang. The plant grows at altitudes of 400-2000m.

The species was first described in 1909. Subsequent identifications of this species occurred in 1910, 1911, and 1913 using the names Vitis reticulata and Vitis marchandii.

References

External links
Plants of the World Online: Vitis marchandii
Flora of China: Vitis wilsoniae 
Vitis wilsoniae (Reticulated Grape)
International Plant Names Index: Vitis marchandii
Yuexi Plant Journal
Global Biodiversity Information Facility: Vitis wilsoniae
The Plant List: Vitis wilsoniae

wilsoniae
Endemic flora of China
Plants described in 1909